William Gallacher  may refer to:

William Gallacher (footballer), Scottish footballer for Burnley
Willie Gallacher (footballer) (born 1919), Scottish footballer for Celtic
Willie Gallacher (politician) (1881–1965), Scottish politician

See also
William Gallagher (disambiguation)